Arctosa littoralis, the beach wolf spider, is a species of wolf spider in the family Lycosidae. It is found in North and Central America.

References

Further reading

 
 
 
 
 
 
 
 
 

littoralis
Articles created by Qbugbot
Spiders described in 1844